Sarcinodes is a genus of moths in the family Geometridae erected by Achille Guenée in 1857. The species are large with pinkish, mauvish or brownish-gray body and wings. The wings are traversed by between one and three oblique, straight fasciae. The forewing apex is acute, slightly falcate. The male antennae are unipectinate, those of the female are typically filiform, in some species unipectinate. The species are found in east Asia.

The small number of host plant records for Sarcinodes are Helicia (Proteaceae).

Species

 Sarcinodes aegrota Butler, 1886
 Sarcinodes aequilinearia Walker, 1860
 Sarcinodes bilineata Moore, 1867
 Sarcinodes carnearia Guenée, 1857
 Sarcinodes compacta Warren, 1896
 Sarcinodes debitaria Walker, 1863
 Sarcinodes derufata Prout, 1921
 Sarcinodes flaviplaga Prout, 1913
 Sarcinodes holzi Pagenstecher, 1884
 Sarcinodes lilacina Moore, 1888
 Sarcinodes luzonensis Wileman & South, 1917
 Sarcinodes mongaku Marumo, 1921
 Sarcinodes olivata Warren, 1905
 Sarcinodes perakaria Swinhoe, 1899
 Sarcinodes punctata Warren, 1894
 Sarcinodes reductatus Inoue, 1992
 Sarcinodes restitutaria Walker, 1862
 Sarcinodes subfulvida Warren, 1896
 Sarcinodes subvirgata  Prout, 1911
 Sarcinodes sumatraria Walker, 1866
 Sarcinodes susana Swinhoe, 1891
 Sarcinodes trilineata Walker, 1866 
 Sarcinodes vultuaria Guenée, 1857
 Sarcinodes yaeyamana Inoue, 1976
 Sarcinodes yeni Sommerer, 1996

References

Oenochrominae